Folksworth and Washingley is a civil parish near Peterborough in Cambridgeshire, England, comprising the villages of Folksworth and Washingley.

The parish was formed following the combination of the two separate parishes of Folksworth and of Washingley between 1931 and 1951.

Government
The civil parish has a parish council, elected by residents of the parish registered on the electoral roll. The parish council is the lowest tier of government in England, responsible for providing and maintaining a variety of local services including allotments and a cemetery;  grass cutting and tree planting within public open spaces such as a village green or playing fields. The parish council reviews all planning applications that might affect the parish and makes recommendations to Huntingdonshire District Council, which is the local planning authority for the parish. The parish council also represents the views of the parish on issues such as local transport, policing and the environment. The parish council raises its own tax to pay for these services, known as the parish precept, which is collected as part of the Council Tax. Folksworth and Washingley Parish Council meets at the village hall on the 3rd Tuesday of the month at 7.20pm.

Demography

Population
In the period 1801 to 1901, the population of Folksworth and Washingley was recorded every ten years by the UK census.  During this time the population was in the range of 193 (the lowest was in 1901) and 319 (the highest was in 1841).

From 1901, a census was taken every ten years with the exception of 1941 (due to the Second World War).

All population census figures from report Historic Census figures Cambridgeshire to 2011 by Cambridgeshire Insight.

References

Huntingdonshire
Civil parishes in Cambridgeshire